Estradiol acetate (EA), sold under the brand names Femtrace, Femring, and Menoring, is an estrogen medication which is used in hormone therapy for the treatment of menopausal symptoms in women. It is taken by mouth once daily or given as a vaginal ring once every three months.

Side effects of estradiol acetate include breast tenderness, breast enlargement, nausea, headache, and fluid retention. Estradiol acetate is an estrogen and hence is an agonist of the estrogen receptor, the biological target of estrogens like estradiol. It is an estrogen ester and a prodrug of estradiol in the body. Because of this, it is considered to be a natural and bioidentical form of estrogen.

Estradiol acetate was introduced for medical use in 2001. It is available in the United States and the United Kingdom. The formulation for use by mouth has been discontinued in the United States.

Medical uses

Estradiol acetate is used as a component of menopausal hormone therapy to treat and prevent menopausal symptoms such as hot flashes and osteoporosis in women.

The Women's Health Initiative studies report increased health risks for menopausal women when using unopposed estrogens. Estrogens with or without progestins should be prescribed at the lowest effective doses and for the shortest duration consistent with treatment goals and risks for the individual woman.

Available forms
Estradiol acetate comes in the form of 0.45, 0.9, and 1.8 mg oral tablets (Femtrace) and in the form of 12.4 or 24.8 mg vaginal rings that release 50 or 100 μg/day estradiol for 3 months (Femring, Menoring). However, the Femtrace product was discontinued in the United States.

Contraindications

Contraindications of estrogens include coagulation problems, cardiovascular diseases, liver disease, and certain hormone-sensitive cancers such as breast cancer and endometrial cancer, among others.

Side effects

The side effects of estradiol acetate are the same as those of estradiol. Examples of such side effects include breast tenderness and enlargement, nausea, bloating, edema, headache, and melasma.

Overdose

Symptoms of estrogen overdosage may include nausea, vomiting, bloating, increased weight, water retention, breast tenderness, vaginal discharge, heavy legs, and leg cramps. These side effects can be diminished by reducing the estrogen dosage.

Interactions

Inhibitors and inducers of cytochrome P450 may influence the metabolism of estradiol and by extension circulating estradiol levels.

Pharmacology

Pharmacodynamics

Estradiol acetate is an estradiol ester, or a prodrug of estradiol. As such, it is an estrogen, or an agonist of the estrogen receptors. Estradiol acetate is of about 15% higher molecular weight than estradiol due to the presence of its C3 acetate ester. Because estradiol acetate is a prodrug of estradiol, it is considered to be a natural and bioidentical form of estrogen.

Pharmacokinetics

Estradiol acetate is converted into estradiol in the body.

Chemistry

Estradiol acetate is a synthetic estrane steroid and the C3 acetate ester of estradiol. It is also known as estradiol 3-acetate or as estra-1,3,5(10)-triene-3,17β-diol 3-acetate. Another common ester of estradiol in use for oral administration is estradiol valerate, which is a C17β ester of estradiol.

The experimental octanol/water partition coefficient (logP) of estradiol acetate is 4.2.

History
Estradiol acetate is relatively recent to the market, having been first approved in a vaginal ring formulation as Menoring in the United Kingdom in 2001, followed by a vaginal ring formulation as Femring in the United States in 2002, and finally as an oral preparation as Femtrace in the United States in 2004.

Society and culture

Generic names
Estradiol acetate is the generic name of the drug and its .

Brand names
Estradiol acetate is marketed under the brand names Femtrace, Femring, and Menoring.

Availability
Estradiol acetate is available in the United States and the United Kingdom.

References

Acetate esters
Estradiol esters
Prodrugs
Secondary alcohols
Synthetic estrogens